Stephen "Steve" Cradock (born 22 August 1969 in Solihull) is an English  guitarist, most notable for playing in the rock group Ocean Colour Scene. Cradock also plays the guitar in Paul Weller's band, having appeared on all of Weller's solo records following his self-titled debut solo album. Cradock began playing lead guitar for British Ska band The Specials in 2014.

He is a distinctive guitarist, who has a retro, 1960s sound. Cradock's influences include The Beatles and The Rolling Stones. Cradock, also known as Fanny, also plays keyboards, bass guitar and drums.

Life and career

Early years
Cradock was born in Solihull, Warwickshire; his father Chris Cradock, a police officer, would later become his son's manager. He was educated at Lode Heath School in Solihull.

Cradock formed his first band called The Boys in 1988, with schoolfriends from Solihull. The band played at various Mod events around the Midlands with a set consisting mainly of cover songs – including The Clash's "Should I Stay Or Should I Go" and The Jam's "Strange Town". Whilst gaining popularity on the Birmingham gig circuit, the band was well received by audiences in various other towns, including London and Bournemouth. An August Bank Holiday festival in Gorleston coincided with the band releasing their first three-track vinyl EP, Happy Days, on their own label. Plans to release a six-track mini-album soon after were never realised. However, the band contributed to a compilation album by the London-based label, Unicorn with their song "Going Out". This was followed by the peak of the band's career–a support slot for Steve Marriott at the Irish Centre in Digbeth.

In the late 1980s Cradock met his idol and future mentor, Paul Weller. He would spend time at Weller's recording studio in Marble Arch, London, trying to pass on The Boys' music. While he was always evicted from the premises by technician Kenny Wheeler, Cradock made a lasting impression on Weller.

Despite catching the attention of Polydor and CBS, the band dissolved and Cradock proceeded to form Ocean Colour Scene with Simon Fowler, Damon Minchella and Oscar Harrison.

Ocean Colour Scene

Cradock formed Ocean Colour Scene in 1989 with Fowler, Minchella and Harrison after the dissolution of both The Boys and The Fanatics. In 1991 Cradock returned to Weller's London studio with Ocean Colour Scene; Cradock and Weller became friends and Ocean Colour Scene were soon invited to tour with Weller.
Within two years of being signed, the band released their debut LP, Ocean Colour Scene, on Fontana Records. Whilst they gained some popularity, the band felt their potential had not been reached. Following Cradock's first full tour with Paul Weller, he self-funded the production of the band's second LP Moseley Shoals.

OCS signed to MCA Records in 1995, and  Moseley Shoals sold over 3,000,000 copies worldwide.

Paul Weller

Cradock joined Weller's band in 1992, having supported him with Ocean Colour Scene. Cradock has appeared on all studio albums by Weller, playing the guitar and other instruments. For the album 22 Dreams, Cradock co-wrote the tracks "Night Lights", "111" and "Song for Alice". In 1999 Weller presented Cradock with a Rickenbacker guitar for his 30th birthday. This guitar can be heard on Ocean Colour Scene's "Free My Name" single from A Hyperactive Workout for the Flying Squad. Weller and Cradock still continue their musical partnership, joining forces whenever Weller takes to the road. Cradock is also credited with co-writing the track "Drifters" on the 2012 release Sonik Kicks  – an album that reached no.1 in the UK albums chart. He also took to the stage with Weller to perform tracks from this album for five nights at London's Roadhouse in March 2012. A version of Cradock's "Lay Down Your Weary Burden" (from his 2011 album Peace City West) featured on Weller's 2012 EP When Your Garden's Overgrown.

Other collaborations

The Smokin' Mojo Filters

Cradock played on a version of The Beatles' song "Come Together" in 1995 for the Warchild release The Help Album. Recorded at Abbey Road Studios, the track featured Paul McCartney, Paul Weller, Noel Gallagher, Steve White, Carleen Anderson and Damon Minchella.

PP Arnold

While working and touring with Ocean Colour Scene in 1997, P. P. Arnold made her first solo album in 25 years, produced by Cradock. A cover of Mike Nesmith's "Different Drum" was released as a single in 1998; as well as producing the track, Cradock also played drums and guitar on it. Despite television and radio promotion, the single failed to chart and the proposed solo album was not released.
Craddock will be alongside her during her 2019 UK tour.

Fire and Skill: The Songs of The Jam

Along with Liam Gallagher, Cradock recorded a version of "Carnation" in 1999, for the Jam tribute album Fire and Skill: The Songs of the Jam. Cradock also played guitar on the album's hidden track, "No One in the World".

Amy MacDonald

Cradock recorded some guitar parts for Macdonald's single "Run". She reciprocated by supporting Cradock on his European acoustic tour with Weller. Steve and his wife Sally toured with Macdonald in Germany as her support act in 2009.

Other collaborations and activities
Cradock contributed guitar to The Players' 2003 album Clear The Decks.

He also contributed rhythm guitar to the 2006 recording of the song "Left, Right and Centre" by the acid jazz act Lord Lorge, which featured Dean Parrish on lead vocals.

The following year, Cradock recorded drums and backing vocals for the Andy Lewis and Paul Weller collaboration "Are You Trying To Be Lonely", which peaked at number 35 in the UK Singles Chart.

Cradock also produced a number of songs for the Newcastle-based band Hungover Stuntmen.

Solo career

The Kundalini Target
Cradock announced on the Ocean Colour Scene website that he had begun work on a solo album in early 2008, the recording of which took place at Black Barn Studios in Surrey. During a phone interview on BBC Radio Tees in April 2008, Cradock discussed his solo album and disclosed that he plays all the instruments on the album. Occasionally, Cradock performed his own songs during his tour with Weller during their acoustic gigs of 2007 and 2008. The album features Paul Weller and wife Sally Cradock.

The album title was confirmed as The Kundalini Target; it reached No. 114 in the album charts, 34 in Play.com's charts and 30 in iTunes' charts.

Peace City West
Cradock's second solo album Peace City West was released on Kundalini Music (a label founded by Cradock and his wife) on 4 April 2011 and features collaborations with James Buckley, from the cult TV show The Inbetweeners, Paul Weller, Sally Cradock, Andy Crofts of The Moons and PP Arnold.

Travel Wild – Travel Free
This September 2013 release by Steve Cradock was his third solo effort, and also featured his wife Sally on co-production and co-writing.

Personal life
Cradock married Sally Edwards, a record plugger for Ocean Colour Scene, in 1996. The couple have two children: a daughter, Sunny Elizabeth (born March 2003); and a son, Casius Earl (born July 2004) and live in Marldon in Devon. He admitted on an appearance on Soccer AM that he is an Aston Villa F.C. fan, although did not attend many games.

References

English rock guitarists
Ocean Colour Scene
Ocean Colour Scene members
1969 births
Living people
Musicians from Birmingham, West Midlands
Britpop musicians
MCA Records artists
Proper Records artists
The Specials members